Ljubljanske novice - slovenski elektronski časopis ("Ljubljana's News - Slovenian electronic newspaper") is a stand-alone online newspaper, based in Ljubljana, Slovenia.

Newspaper was registered on 20 October 1995 by Urad Republike Slovenije za informiranje (Bureau of Republic of Slovenia for Information); it became the first Slovenian online newspaper and one of the first stand-alone online newspapers in Europe. Founder and its chief editor is Janez Temlin.

Literature 
 Neuland Europa: sechswege nach brüssel; 2002: 
 Ljubljana - mesto kulture;

See also 
 Valentin Vodnik's Lublanske novice, first Slovenian newspaper

s

External links 
 Official page
 International directory of Media and Newspapers

Mass media in Ljubljana
Newspapers published in Slovenia
Slovene-language newspapers
1995 establishments in Slovenia
European news websites